Bright Examples is the fifth studio album by husband and wife duo Sarah Lee Guthrie & Johnny Irion. Their previous album Go Waggaloo was recorded for children,  so Bright Examples is their first release in the folk and Americana genre. The collaborative project features producers Andy Cabic (lead singer/songwriter in the band Vetiver) and Thom Monahan (Devendra Banhart, Vetiver).

Track listing 
All songs by Johnny Irion except "Seven Sisters" and "Butterflies" by Sarah Lee Guthrie.

Personnel 
 Johnny Irion - vocals, guitar, piano
 Sarah Lee Guthrie - vocals, guitars, percussion
 Andy Cabic - vocals, guitar
 Neal Casal - guitar, piano
 Gary Louris - vocals
 Otto Houser - drums, percussion
 Kevin Barker - guitar
 Daniel Hindman - bass
 Charlie Rose - guitar, steel, cello
 Radoslav Lorković - organ, piano, Wurly
 Mark Olson - vocals
 Ken Mauri - piano

Production 
 Producer - Andy Cabic, Thom Monahan 
 Recorded at - Dreamland Studios (West Hurley, NY)
 Mixed at - The Hangar by Thom Monahan
 Mastered by - JJ Golden at Golden Mastering
 Mastering Engineer - Greg Calbi
 Photos by - Neal Casal
 Design by - Marc Harkness

2011 albums
Sarah Lee Guthrie & Johnny Irion albums